Amiran Chichinadze (14 September 1934 - 24 June 2007) was a Georgian screenwriter and actor.

Biography 
In 1964 he graduated from the Higher Courses for Scriptwriters and Directors. He was a member of the CPSU from 1975.

Filmography

As screenwriter 
 1966 — Falling Leaves (1966 film)
 1971 — Mkudro savane
 1973 — Rekordi
 1975 — Berikatsebi
 1980 — Tserilebi Bamidan
 1981 — Shvidi patara motkhroba pirvel sikvarulze
 1985 — Kvelaze stsrapebi msoplioshi
 1985 — Batono avanturistebo
 1988 — Nazaris ukanaskneli lotsva
 1989 — 30 cm zgvis donidan
 1989 — Dzaglis knosva
 1990 — Tsetskhltan tamashi
 1992 — Shvidkatsa
 1992 — Khapangi
 1995 — Khiznebi
 1996 — Ra gatsinebs?!
 1998 — Here Comes the Dawn
 2002 — Angelozis gadaprena

As producer 
 1970 — Kvevri

As actor 
 2002 — Angelozis gadaprena

Awards 
 1983 — Honored Art Worker of the Georgian SSR

Literature 
 Cinema: Encyclopedic Dictionary / Ch. ed. S. I. Yutkevich Moscow, Soviet Encyclopedia, 1987 p. 489

References 

Screenwriters from Georgia (country)
Soviet screenwriters
20th-century screenwriters